Jean-Yves Leconte (born 31 October 1966 in Paris) is a member of the Senate of France, representing the constituency of French citizens living abroad.  He is a member of the Socialist Party.

Leconte lived more than 20 years in Poland and was a member of the Assembly of French Citizens Abroad from 1994.

References
Page on the Senate website
Personal website

1966 births
Living people
Socialist Party (France) politicians
French Senators of the Fifth Republic
Senators of French citizens living abroad
Politicians from Paris
Lycée Condorcet alumni
École Centrale Paris alumni